Fitness may refer to:

 Physical fitness, a state of health and well-being of the body
 Fitness (biology), an individual's ability to propagate its genes
 Fitness (cereal), a brand of breakfast cereals and granola bars
 Fitness (magazine), a women's magazine, focusing on health and exercise
 Fitness and figure competition, a form of physique training, related to bodybuilding
 Fitness approximation, a method of function optimization evolutionary computation or artificial evolution methodologies
 Fitness function, a particular type of objective function in mathematics and computer science
 "Fitness", a 2018 song by Lizzo

See also 
 FitNesse, a web server, a wiki, and a software testing tool
Survival of the fittest